Willem Frederik "Wim" Schokking (14 August 1900, Amsterdam – 5 July 1960, Amsterdam) was a Dutch politician from the Christian Historical Union. He was Minister of War and Minister of Marine in the Drees-Van Schaik cabinet, from 1948 to 1950. In his tenure as Minister, he was responsible for the deployment of troops to Indonesia during Operation Kraai and their repatriation afterwards. From 1951 to 1960 he was member of the Council of State.

References

1900 births
1960 deaths
Aldermen of Amsterdam
Ministers of War of the Netherlands
Ministers of the Navy of the Netherlands
Municipal councillors of Amsterdam
Christian Historical Union politicians
20th-century Dutch politicians
Dutch civil servants
Lawyers from Amsterdam
Dutch members of the Dutch Reformed Church
University of Amsterdam alumni
20th-century Dutch lawyers